Archivea is a genus of flowering plants belonging to the family Orchidaceae.

Its native range is Brazil.

Species:

Archivea kewensis

References

Orchids
Orchid genera